Idaho's 1st congressional district is one of two congressional districts in the U.S. state of Idaho. It comprises the western portion of the state. The 1st district is currently represented by Russ Fulcher, a Republican from Meridian, who was first elected in 2018, and re-elected in 2020 and 2022.

History
From statehood in 1890 to the 1910 election, Idaho was represented by a statewide at-large seat. Following the 1910 census, Idaho gained a second House seat; it was first contested in 1912. However, through the 1916 election, both seats were statewide at-large seats. The first election in Idaho with two congressional districts was in 1918.

The 2012 election cycle saw the district remain largely in the shape it has had since the 1950s, encompassing the western third of the state. Historically, it has been reckoned as the Boise district, as it usually included most of the state capital. The 2020 redistricting cycle, however, saw the 1st pushed to the west, shifting almost all of its share of Boise to the 2nd district. This was due to a significant increase in population directly west of Boise over the previous decade, in Canyon County and western Ada County. However, the 1st continues to include most of Boise's suburbs.  In Ada County itself, the district continues to include Meridian, Eagle, Kuna, and some parts of Boise, south of Interstate 84. It also includes the entire northern portion of the state, through the Panhandle.

Recent statewide election results

Presidential election results
Results from previous presidential elections

Non-presidential results
Results from previous non-presidential statewide elections

List of members representing the district

Election results

2002

2004

2006

2008

2010

2012

2014

2016

2018

2020

2022

Historical district boundaries

See also
Idaho's congressional districts
List of United States congressional districts

References

External links

 Congressional Biographical Directory of the United States 1774–present

01
Constituencies established in 1919
1919 establishments in Idaho